Tel Shikmona, or Tell es-Samak, also spelt Sycamine, is an ancient Phoenician tell (mound) situated near the sea coast in the modern city of Haifa, Israel, just south of the Israeli National Institute of Oceanography. It has been called a "forgotten Phoenician site". Nowadays researchers identify Tell es-Smak with Porphyreon (south).

History
In the Periplus of Pseudo-Scylax it is mentioned the Sykaminon (Συκάμινον) as a city of the Tyrians, and also that there was a river of the same name. Stephanus of Byzantium called it Sykaminon (Συκαμίνων) and called it a city of the Phoenicians.
Josephus in his Antiquities mentions Shikmona (Sycamine) as being a place where ships could be brought to harbor, and where Ptolemy Lathyrus, during an incursion in the country, had brought his army ashore. Strabo mentions the site (Sycaminopolis, Συκαμίνων πόλις) as being no more than a ruin in his own day. The Mishnah (Demai 1:1), compiled in 189 CE, mentions the region of Shikmona as being renowned for its cultivated variety of jujubes (Hebrew: rīmīn). The Bordeaux pilgrim in 333 CE passed through Sycaminon while traveling through the Holy Land.

Archaeology

Excavation history

The main archaeological excavations conducted at the tell and in the Byzantine city south of it, were carried out by the archaeologist J. Elgavish in the 1960s–70s on behalf of the Department of Museums, Municipality of Haifa.

Salvage excavations were conducted in the 1990s by the Israel Antiquities Authority (IAA) and concentrated in the eastern part of the Byzantine city, west of the Carmel Mountain slopes, where the city's necropolis is. In 2010–2011 a new series of excavation seasons was conducted by a team from the Zinman Institute of Archaeology at the University of Haifa, headed by Dr. Michael Eisenberg with Dr. Shay Bar  directing the excavations on the tell itself. The goals of the project were to re-expose excavated archaeological complexes south and east of the tell previously excavated by Elgavish, expand those areas and undertake extensive conservation work in order to preserve the antiquities and present them to the public as part of Shikmona Public Park. The work also aimed to study the stratification of the tell and create a precise chronological framework.

Findings
The remains on the tell date from the Late Bronze Age to the Late Byzantine period. The lower city, east and mainly south of the tell, is dated to the Late Roman period-Byzantine period. No remains have been found dating to the Early Arab period, leading the archaeologists to conclude that Shikmona was abandoned before the 7th century CE.

Tel Shikmona has yielded various types of sherds, the most common of which belonging to the red-slipped plates and bowls (Eastern sigillata A) made on the Phoenician coast during the 1st century CE. In addition, archaeologists discovered evidence for dyeing industry based on the Murex sea snail, also known as Tyrian purple, dating back to the Iron Age. The purple dye extracted from the mollusk was used by the potters of Shikmona to paint pottery. After the discovery, the entire collection of painted pottery underwent a chemical analysis to determine the make-up of the paint, during which time it was confirmed that the color was an authentic purple dye extracted from the Murex sea snail.

Identification

It is agreed among scholars that the site, Tell es-Samak, has no identification so far during the Biblical periods. Latest historical and archaeological research points towards the identification of the site during Hellenistic-Byzantine periods as Porphyreon (south). This new identification fits with the clear Christian remains at the site and the absence of Jewish ones as should expected from Shikmona.

Nature reserve and national park
Shikmona was declared a 1677-dunam nature reserve in 2008. A small area (73 dunams) was declared a national park, as well.

References

National parks of Israel
Archaeological sites in Israel
Land of Israel
Tel Shikmona
Tel Shikmona
Tel Shikmona
Tells (archaeology)
Phoenician cities